Adam Jan Brodecki (1 August 1949 – 17 October 2010) was a Polish pediatrician, member of the Sejm (1989–1991), and former competitive pair skater. With his skating partner, Grażyna Kostrzewińska (Osmańska), he placed 11th at the 1972 Winter Olympics in Sapporo.

With his wife Halina, also a medical doctor, he had two sons, Marcin (born in 1971), Adam (1976), and a daughter, Katarzyna (1983).

Results

With Kostrzewińska (Osmańska)

With Pawlina

References

External links 
 
 
 

1949 births
2010 deaths
Polish male pair skaters
Olympic figure skaters of Poland
Sportspeople from Łódź
Figure skaters at the 1972 Winter Olympics